Iván Pérez may refer to:
Iván Pérez Rossi (born 1943), Venezuelan singer
Iván Pérez (water polo) (born 1971), Spanish water polo player
Iván Pérez (footballer, born 1976), Spanish football forward
Iván Pérez (footballer, born 1985), Spanish football midfielder
Jorge Iván Pérez (born 1990), Argentine footballer
Iván Pérez (footballer, born 1992), Spanish football leftback
Iván Pérez (Cuban footballer), forward for FC Camagüey